Albert Londe (26 November 1858 – 11 September 1917) was an influential French photographer, medical researcher and chronophotographer. He is remembered for his work as a medical photographer at the Salpêtrière Hospital in Paris, funded by the Parisian authorities, as well as being a pioneer in X-ray photography.
  
During his two decades at the Salpêtrière, Albert Londe developed into arguably the most outstanding scientific photographer of his time.

In 1878 neurologist Jean-Martin Charcot hired Londe as a medical photographer at the Salpêtrière. In 1882 Londe devised a system to photograph the physical and muscular movements of patients (including individuals experiencing epileptic seizures). This he accomplished by using a camera with nine lenses that were triggered by electromagnetic energy, and with the use of a metronome he was able to sequentially time the release of the shutters, therefore taking photos onto glass plates in quick succession. A few years later Londe developed a camera with twelve lenses for photographing movement.

Londe's camera was also used for medical studies of muscle movement in subjects performing actions as diverse as those of a tightrope-walking and blacksmithing. The sequence of twelve pictures could be created for durations from 1/10 of a second to several seconds.

Although the apparatus was used primarily for medical research, Londe noted that it was portable, and he used it for other subjects - for example, horses and other animals and ocean waves. General Sobert developed, in conjunction with Londe, a chronophotographic device used to study ballistics. Londe's pictures were used as illustrations in several books, most notably those by Paul Richer, that were widely read by the medical and artistic fraternity.

With Étienne-Jules Marey (1830–1904), Londe performed many photographic experiments of movement, and the layout of his laboratory at the Salpêtrière was similar to Marey's renowned Station Physiologique. In 1893 Londe published the first book on medical photography, titled La photographie médicale: Application aux sciences médicales et physiologiques. In 1898 he published Traité pratique de radiographie et de radioscope: technique et applications médicales.

Londe also published six journals. Albert Londe's 12-lens camera of 1891 was illustrated in the journal 'La Nature', 1893.

Written Works 
 Anatomie pathologique de la moelle epiniere (1891) (with Paul Oscar Blocq)
 In 1893 Londe published the first book on medical photography, titled La photographie médicale: Application aux sciences médicales et physiologiques.
 In 1898 he published Traité pratique de radiographie et de radioscope: technique et applications médicales.

See also 
 History of photography
 A Clinical Lesson at the Salpêtrière

References 

 History of Cinematography
 Who's Who of Victorian Cinema

1858 births
1917 deaths
French photographers